Kaulbach or von Kaulbach is a German surname. Notable people with the surname include:

Bruno Franz Kaulbach (1880–1963), Austrian Lawyer
Charles Edwin Kaulbach (1834–1907), a Canadian merchant, ship owner and political figure
Four German painters:
Wilhelm von Kaulbach (1804–1874) 
Friedrich Kaulbach (1822–1903) 
 Hermann von Kaulbach (1846–1909)
Friedrich August von Kaulbach (1850–1920)

See also
 Kaulback, a similar surname
Kreimbach-Kaulbach, municipality in Rhineland-Palatinate
5491 Kaulbach, an asteroid.

German-language surnames